General elections were held in Paraguay on 27 April 2003. The presidential elections were won by Nicanor Duarte of the Colorado Party, who received 38.3% of the vote. In the Congressional elections, the Colorado Party won 37 of the 80 seats in the Chamber of Deputies and 16 of the 45 seats in the Senate. Voter turnout was 64.3% in the presidential election, 64.2% in the Senate election and 64.1% in the Chamber of Deputies election.

Results

President

Senate

Chamber of Deputies

References

Paraguay
General
Elections in Paraguay
Presidential elections in Paraguay
Paraguay